Land of Makebelieve was an amusement park located in the hamlet of Upper Jay, New York, United States. It was in operation from 1954 until 1979. The park was designed and built by Arto Monaco.

In contrast to many more modern theme parks, Land of Makebelieve was a more low-key, whimsical attraction where children were encouraged to use their imagination. It allowed children to wander from place to place in the park as their whims guided them, without having to follow any sort of structured program or itinerary. As a park built strictly for children, parents were encouraged to just sit back and watch. Attractions and points of interest in the park were all built to half-scale, suitable for children age 12 and under. They included a castle, a riverboat, a train, several fairy tale houses, and a stagecoach and old western town.

The park was permanently closed in 1979 after suffering extensive flooding damage from the nearby Ausable River. (Less damaging floods had occurred 11 times previously.) Some of the fairy tale houses that were undamaged were relocated to what was then a similar type park called Storytown, located in Queensbury, New York. That park is now the Six Flags-owned Great Escape.

The official name of the park (on signs and literature) did spell "Makebelieve" as one word, in contrast to the more common "Make-Believe" or "Make Believe" forms.

A 2006 Mountain Lake PBS documentary, "A CASTLE IN EVERY HEART: THE ARTO MONACO STORY" chronicles the life and work of Arto Monaco (1913-2003), the pioneering designer and gifted storyteller who was also responsible for Santa’s Workshop, another nearby children's attraction in the North Pole hamlet of Wilmington, NY.

As a result of flood waters generated by Hurricane Irene on August 28, 2011, the last remaining building from the former park - the castle - was destroyed.

External links
 Land of Makebelieve photos on theimaginaryworld.com
 Land of Makebelieve tribute page
 The Arto Monaco Historical Society
 All Points North article

Buildings and structures in Essex County, New York
1954 establishments in New York (state)
1979 disestablishments in New York (state)
Defunct amusement parks in New York (state)
Amusement parks opened in 1954
Amusement parks closed in 1979